Microhyla mantheyi (common name: Manthey's narrow-mouthed frog) is a species of microhylid frog. It is endemic to the Malay Peninsula and occurs in southern Myanmar, southern Thailand, Peninsular Malaysia, and Singapore. However, molecular data suggest that the nominal species consists of at least two cryptic species.

Microhyla mantheyi inhabits lowland forests and slightly disturbed areas where they are usually found on the ground or in low vegetation.

References

mantheyi
Amphibians of Malaysia
Amphibians of Myanmar
Amphibians of Singapore
Amphibians of Thailand
Amphibians described in 2007
Taxa named by Indraneil Das